4649 may refer to:

 NGC 4649, another name for Messier 60, an elliptical galaxy
 ADS 4649, a star in double system
 4649 Sumoto, a minor planet
 4649 ("yoroshiku"), a Japanese wordplay
 4649, a year in the 5th millennium